Luca Rossetti (1705–1770) was an Italian painter and architect of the 18th century, active in the region of the Piedmont. He painted in style combining luminous late-Baroque and early-Neoclassic styles. He painted the fresco of the Holy Trinity.

He was born in Orta San Giulio, and active in Ivrea, including in the church of San Gaudenzio.

References 

1705 births
1777 deaths
People from Orta San Giulio
18th-century Italian painters
Italian male painters
Painters from Piedmont
18th-century Italian male artists